Stefano Alberto Bonfiglio (born February 1964) is an Italian businessman, the co-founder and managing partner of Stirling Square Capital Partners, a London-based private equity firm that invests in companies valued between €50 million and €500 million.

Early life
Stefano Alberto Bonfiglio was born in Italy in February 1964. He has a bachelor's degree in International Economics from Georgetown University, a master's degree in International Studies from the University of Pennsylvania, and an MBA from the Wharton Business School.

Career
Bonfiglio worked for Bankers Trust in New York and Milan for eight years, then became a managing director with Donaldson, Lufkin & Jenrette, and then was co-founder and managing director of Tetragon Partners, a private equity firm.

Stirling Square was co-founded by Bonfiglio in 2002, and has "total committed capital in excess of €1 billion".

Personal life
Bonfiglio was married to jewelry designer Rosa de la Cruz Bonfiglio, the daughter of Carlos de la Cruz, a Cuban-born American businessman and art collector, and they had four sons together.

In 2010, Bonfiglio was in a relationship with TV presenter Trinny Woodall.

In 2014, Bonfiglio married Carolina Gonzalez-Bunster, daughter of Rolando Gonzalez-Bunster, a US-based Argentine businessman, and they have a son and a daughter together. She is a former Goldman Sachs banker and the founder of the Walkabout Foundation, of which Bonfiglio is a director.

They live in Knightsbridge, London. Their wedding was attended by Hillary and Bill Clinton.

References

1964 births
Businesspeople from London
Italian financial businesspeople
Italian chief executives
Living people